D401 is a state road branching off from D66 state road connecting it to Pula Airport.

The road, as well as all other state roads in Croatia, is managed and maintained by Hrvatske ceste, state owned company.

Road junctions

See also
 Pula Airport

Sources

State roads in Croatia
Transport in Istria County